Regional councils (plural: , Mo'atzot Ezoriyot / singular: , Mo'atza Ezorit) are one of the three types of Israel's local government entities, with the other two being cities and local councils. As of 2019, there were 54 regional councils, usually responsible for governing a number of settlements spread across rural areas. Regional councils include representation of anywhere between 3 and 54 communities, usually spread over a relatively large area within geographical vicinity of each other.

Each community within a regional council usually does not exceed 2,000 in population and is managed by a local committee. This committee sends representatives to the administering regional council proportionate to their size of membership and according to an index which is fixed before each election. Those settlements without an administrative council do not send any representatives to the regional council, instead being dealt by it directly. Representatives from those settlements which are represented directly are either chosen directly or through an election. The predominant form of communities represented on regional councils are kibbutzim and moshavim.

List of regional councils

The following sortable table lists all 53 regional councils by name, and the district or area according to the Israel Central Bureau of Statistics.

The list includes the regional councils in the Golan Heights and the West Bank, areas considered occupied territories under international law, although the Israeli government disputes this.

Former regional councils

See also
City council (Israel)
Local council (Israel)
List of Israeli cities

References

External links 
Local Government in Israel. The Knesset Lexicon of Terms. 2009

 
Subdivisions of Israel
Regional councils